The 2012–13 Major Indoor Soccer League season was the second under the United Soccer Leagues banner, fourth under the MISL name, and the fifth season overall. It was also the 35th season of professional Division 1 indoor soccer. The season started on November 2, 2012 and ended on March 3, 2013.

Teams

New Teams

Teams that left the MISL

Managerial changes

Standings

Updated to matches played on 3/3/2013

Statistics

Top scorers

Last updated on March 3, 2013. Source: MISL.com Statistics - Total Points

Top 2pt Goal Scorers

Last updated on March 3, 2013. Source: MISL.com Statistics - 2 Point Goals

Playoffs
The MISL Playoffs will begin with the semifinals, featuring the No. 1 and No. 4 seeds and the No. 2 and No. 3 seeds meeting in home-and-home series with a 15-minute mini game to decide the series following the second game if needed.  The championship followed the same format. The higher seed will had the option to choose which game it hosts.

Semi-finals

Game 1

Game 2

Mini-Game Tie Breaker

MISL Finals

Game 1

Game 2

Awards

Individual Awards

All-League First Team

All-League Second Team

All-Rookie Team

External links
 MISL

Major Indoor Soccer League (2008–2014) seasons
Major Indoor Soccer League
Major Indoor Soccer League